In music theory, Roman numeral analysis is a type of musical analysis in which chords are represented by Roman numerals  (I, II, III, IV, …). In some cases, Roman numerals denote scale degrees themselves. More commonly, however, they represent the chord whose root note is that scale degree. For instance, III denotes either the third scale degree or, more commonly, the chord built on it. Typically, uppercase Roman numerals (such as I, IV, V) are used to represent major chords, while lowercase Roman numerals (such as ii, iii, vi) are used to represent minor chords (see Major and Minor below for alternative notations). However, some music theorists use upper-case Roman numerals for all chords, regardless of chord quality.

In Western classical music in the 2000s, some music students and theorists use Roman numeral analysis to analyze the harmony of a composition. In pop, rock, traditional music, and jazz and blues, Roman numerals can be used to notate the chord progression of a song independent of key. For instance, the standard twelve-bar blues progression uses the chords I (first), IV (fourth), V (fifth), sometimes written I7, IV7, V7, since they are often dominant seventh chords. In the key of C major, the first scale degree (tonic) is C, the fourth (subdominant) is F, and the fifth (dominant) is a G. So the I7, IV7, and V7 chords are C7, F7, and G7. On the other hand, in the key of A major, the I7, IV7, and V7 chords would be A7, D7, and E7. Roman numerals thus abstract chord progressions, making them independent of key, so they can easily be transposed.

History 

Roman numeral analysis is based on the idea that chords can be represented and named by one of their notes, their root (see History of the Root (chord) article for more information). The system came about initially from the work and writings of Rameau’s fundamental bass.

Arabic numerals have been used in the 18th century for the purpose of denoting the fundamental bass, but that aspect will not be considered here. The earliest usage of Roman numerals may be found in the first volume of Johann Kirnberger's Die Kunst des reinen Satzes in 1774. Soon after, Abbé Georg Joseph Vogler occasionally employed Roman numerals in his Grunde der Kuhrpfälzischen Tonschule in 1778. He mentioned them also in his Handbuch zur Harmonielehre of 1802 and employed Roman numeral analysis in several publications from 1806 onwards.

Gottfried Weber's Versuch einer geordneten Theorie der Tonsetzkunst (Theory of Musical Composition) (1817–21) is often credited with popularizing the method. More precisely, he introduced the usage of large capital numerals for major chords, small capitals for minor, superscript o for diminished 5ths and dashed 7 for major sevenths – see the figure hereby. Simon Sechter, considered the founder of the Viennese "Theory of the degrees" (Stufentheorie), made only a limited use of Roman numerals, always as capital letters, and often marked the fundamentals with letter notation or with Arabic numbers. Anton Bruckner, who transmitted the theory to Schoenberg and Schenker, apparently did not use Roman numerals in his classes in Vienna.

Common practice numerals
In music theory related to or derived from the common practice period, Roman numerals are frequently used to designate scale degrees as well as the chords built on them. In some contexts, however, arabic numerals with carets are used to designate the scale degrees themselves  (e.g.

The basic Roman numeral analysis symbols commonly used in pedagogical texts are shown in the table below.

{| class="wikitable"
|-
!Symbol || Meaning || Examples
|-
||Uppercase Roman numeral ||Major triad|| I
|-
||Lowercase Roman numeral ||Minor triad|| i
|-
||Superscript +||Augmented triad|| I+
|-
||Superscript ||Diminished triad|| i
|-
||Superscript number || Added note || V7
|-
||Two or more numbers(#-#) ||Figured bass notation|| V4–3
|-
| rowspan="2" |Superscript # and 
|First inversion|| I6
|-
|Second inversion|| I
|}

The Roman numerals for the seven root-position diatonic triads built on the notes of the C major scale are shown below.

In addition, according to Music: In Theory and Practice, "[s]ometimes it is necessary to indicate sharps, flats, or naturals above the bass note."

Secondary chords are indicated with a slash e.g. V/V.

Modern Schenkerians often prefer the usage of large capital numbers for all degrees in all modes, in conformity with Schenker's own usage.

Inversions 

Roman numerals are sometimes complemented by Arabic numerals to denote inversion of the chords. The system is similar to that of Figured bass, the Arabic numerals describing the characteristic interval(s) above the bass note of the chord, the figures 3 and 5 usually being omitted. The first inversion is denoted by the numeral 6 (e.g. I6 for the first inversion of the tonic triad, even though a complete figuring would require I); the numerals  denotes the second inversion (eg I). Inverted seventh chords are similarly denoted by one or two Arabic numerals describing the most characteristic intervals, namely the interval of a second between the 7th and the root: V7 is the dominant 7th (e.g. G–B–D–F); V is its first inversion (B–D–F–G); V its second inversion (D–F–G–B); and V or V2 its third inversion (F–G–B–D).

In the United Kingdom, there exists another system where the Roman numerals are paired with Latin letters to denote inversion. In this system, an “a” suffix is used to represent root position, “b” for first inversion, and “c” for second inversion.

Jazz and pop numerals

In music theory, fake books and lead sheets aimed towards jazz and popular music, many tunes and songs are written in a key, and as such for all chords, a letter name and symbols are given for all triads (e.g., C, G7, Dm, etc.). In some fake books and lead sheets, all triads may be represented by upper case numerals, followed by a symbol to indicate if it is not a major chord (e.g. "m" for minor or "" for half-diminished or "7" for a seventh chord). An upper case numeral that is not followed by a symbol is understood as a major chord. The use of Roman numerals enables the rhythm section performers to play the song in any key requested by the bandleader or lead singer. The accompaniment performers translate the Roman numerals to the specific chords that would be used in a given key.

In the key of E major, the diatonic chords are:

Emaj7 becomes Imaj7 (also I∆7, or simply I)
Fm7 becomes IIm7 (also II−7, IImin7, IIm, or II−)
Gm7 becomes IIIm7 (also III−7, IIImin7, IIIm, or III−)
Amaj7 becomes IVmaj7 (also IV∆7, or simply IV)
B7 becomes V7 (or simply V; often V9 or V13 in a jazz context)
Cm7 becomes VIm7 (also VI−7, VImin7, VIm, or VI−)
Dø7 becomes VIIø7 (also VIIm7b5, VII-7b5, or VIIø)

In popular music and rock music, "borrowing" of chords from the parallel minor of a major key is commonly done. As such, in these genres, in the key of E major, chords such as D major (or VII), G major (III) and C major (VI) are commonly used. These chords are all borrowed from the key of E minor. Similarly, in minor keys, chords from the parallel major may also be "borrowed". For example, in E minor, the diatonic chord built on the fourth scale degree is IVm, or A minor. However, in practice, many songs in E minor will use IV (A major), which is borrowed from the key of E major. Borrowing from the parallel major in a minor key, however, is much less common.

Using the V7 or V chord (V dominant 7, or V major) is typical of most jazz and pop music regardless of whether the key is major or minor. Though the V chord is not diatonic to a minor scale, using it in a minor key is not usually considered "borrowing," given its prevalence in these styles.

Diatonic scales

Major scale 
The table below shows the Roman numerals for chords built on the major scale.

{| class="wikitable"
|-
!Scale degree ||Tonic||Supertonic||Mediant||Subdominant||Dominant||Submediant||Leading tone
|-
|Conventional notation|| align="center" | I || align="center" | ii || align="center" | iii || align="center" | IV || align="center" | V || align="center" | vi || align="center" | vii
|-
|Alternative notation|| align="center" | I || align="center" | II || align="center" | III || align="center" | IV || align="center" | V || align="center" | VI || align="center" | VII
|-
|Chord symbol|| align="center" | I Maj || align="center" | II min || align="center" | III min || align="center" | IV Maj || align="center" | V Maj  || align="center" | VI min || align="center" | VII dim 
|}

In the key of C major, these chords are

Minor scale 
The table below shows the Roman numerals for the chords built on the natural minor scale.

{| class="wikitable"
!Scale degree || Tonic || Supertonic || Mediant || Subdominant || Dominant || Submediant ||Subtonic|| Leading tone
|-
|Conventional notation|| align="center" | i || align="center" | ii|| align="center" |III|| align="center" | iv || align="center" | v || align="center" |VI || align="center" |VII || align="center" | vii
|-
|Alternative notation|| align="center" | I || align="center" | ii|| align="center" | iii || align="center" | iv || align="center" | v || align="center" | vi || colspan="2" align="center" | vii
|-
|Chord symbol|| align="center" | I min || align="center" | II dim || align="center" |III Aug(or III Maj) || align="center" | IV min(or IV Maj) || align="center" | V min(or V7) || align="center" |VI Maj || align="center" |VII Maj|| align="center" | VII dim(or VII)
|}

In the key of C minor (natural minor), these chords are

The seventh scale degree is very often raised a half step to form a leading tone, making the dominant chord (V) a major chord (i.e. V major instead of v minor) and the subtonic chord (vii), a diminished chord (vii, instead of VII). This version of minor scale is called the harmonic minor scale. This enables composers to have a dominant chord (V) and also the dominant seventh chord (V7) both available for a stronger cadence resolution in the minor key, thus V to i minor.

Modes 
In traditional notation, the triads of the seven modern modes are the following:

{| class="wikitable"
|-
!  || Mode || Tonic || Supertonic || Mediant || Subdominant || Dominant || Submediant || Subtonic /Leading tone
|-
| 1 || Ionian (major) ||align=center| I ||align=center| ii ||align=center| iii ||align=center| IV ||align=center| V ||align=center| vi ||align=center| vii
|-
| 2 || Dorian ||align=center| i ||align=center| ii ||align=center| III ||align=center| IV ||align=center| v ||align=center| vi ||align=center| VII
|-
| 3 || Phrygian ||align=center| i ||align=center| II ||align=center| III ||align=center| iv ||align=center| v ||align=center| VI ||align=center| vii
|-
| 4 || Lydian ||align=center| I ||align=center| II ||align=center| iii ||align=center| iv ||align=center| V ||align=center| vi ||align=center| vii
|-
| 5 || Mixolydian ||align=center| I ||align=center| ii ||align=center| iii ||align=center| IV ||align=center| v ||align=center| vi ||align=center| VII
|-
| 6 || Aeolian (natural minor) ||align=center| i ||align=center| ii ||align=center| III ||align=center| iv ||align=center| v ||align=center| VI ||align=center| VII
|-
| 7 || Locrian ||align=center| i ||align=center| II ||align=center| iii ||align=center| iv ||align=center| V ||align=center| VI ||align=center| vii
|}

Footnotes

References

Chords
Musical analysis